Thy Mighty Contract is the first full-length album by Greek extreme metal band Rotting Christ, released in late 1993 on Osmose Productions.

It was re-released by Century Black in January 1998 with two bonus tracks originally released on the Apokathelosis EP and different artwork.

Track listing 
 "The Sign of Evil Existence" – 2:00
 "Transform All Sufferings into Plagues" – 5:25
 "Fgmenth, Thy Gift" – 4:29
 "His Sleeping Majesty" – 5:50
 "Exiled Archangels" – 5:07
 "Dive the Deepest Abyss" – 3:33
 "The Coronation of the Serpent" – 4:06
 "The Fourth Knight of Revelation (I & II)" – 6:49
 "Visions of the Dead Lover" (bonus track on re-issue) - 4:45
 "The Mystical Meeting" (bonus track on re-issue) - 5:03

Credits 
 Sakis “Necromayhem” Tolis – guitar, vocals
 George “Magus Wampyr Daoloth” Zaharopoulos – keyboards
 Jim “Mutilator” Patsouris – bass
 Themis “Necrosauron” Tolis – drums

Contrary to popular belief that drum programming was used on this album, the drums were actually recorded live using an electronic drum kit.

Musical style 
Rotting Christ plays fast black metal in the Greek style, which was, according to AllMusic journalist Eduardo Rivadavia, “slightly over-reliant on furious blastbeats”, but showing “a budding flair for melody”. Chad Bowar of About.com describes the style as black metal which “took on a melodic, slightly heavy metal-ish format“, with a “limited supply of rhythm blasting and lifeless tremolo riffing”.

Reviews 
Allmusic journalist Eduardo Rivadavia called Thy Mighty Contract “a promising first long-player”, although “the album's production may have been somewhat subpar, and its songs slightly over-reliant on furious blastbeats, but none of this mattered a lick to hardcore extreme metal fans”. About.com featured the album as a Retro Recommendation and criticised the drums for being “too loud, and given the repetitive beats played, it becomes distracting at times. However, the bass is audible, which automatically makes the record something to cherish.“

References 

1993 albums
Rotting Christ albums